Jill Janssens (born 3 October 2003) is a Belgian footballer who plays as a forward for OH Leuven and the Belgium national team.

International career
Janssens made her debut for the Belgium national team on 10 June 2021, coming on as a substitute for Lenie Onzia against Spain.

References

External links
 

2003 births
Living people
Women's association football forwards
Belgian women's footballers
Belgium women's international footballers
Oud-Heverlee Leuven (women) players
Super League Vrouwenvoetbal players